This is a list of Canadian actresses and actors from the province of Québec, Canada.



A

 Paul Ahmarani
 Karina Aktouf
 Benz Antoine
 Denys Arcand
 Gabriel Arcand
 François Arnaud
 Sylvio Arriola
 Robin Aubert
 Charlotte Aubin
 Dhanaé Audet-Beaulieu

B

 Jessica Barker
 Jay Baruchel
 Christian Bégin
 Dorothée Berryman
 Émilie Bierre
 Yannick Bisson
 Isabelle Blais
 Claude Blanchard
 Lothaire Bluteau
 Raymond Bouchard
 Jean-Carl Boucher
 Glenda Braganza
 Pierre Brassard
 Pierre-Luc Brillant
 Evelyne Brochu
 Geneviève Brouillette
 Geneviève Bujold
 Pascale Bussières

C

 Sophie Cadieux
 Jesse Camacho
 Mark Camacho
 France Castel
 Monia Chokri
 Yves Corbeil
 Irlande Côté
 Jean Coutu
 Stéphane Crête
 Marie-Josée Croze
 Pierre Curzi
 Elisha Cuthbert

D

 Normand D'Amour
 Ellen David
 Stéphane Demers
 Caroline Dhavernas
 Véronic DiCaire
 Xavier Dolan
 Mike Dopud
 Fifi D'Orsay
 Anne Dorval
 Jean Duceppe
 André Ducharme
 Paul Dupuis
 Roy Dupuis

F

 Marc Favreau
 Colm Feore
 Jennifer Finnigan 
 Glenn Ford
 Michel Forget

G

 Claude Gauthier
 Gratien Gélinas
 Mitsou Gélinas
 Émile Genest
 Rémy Girard
 Fernande Giroux
 Huntley Gordon
 Robert Gravel
 Marc-André Grondin
 Bruce Greenwood

H

 Patrick Hivon
 William Hope
 Germain Houde
 Patrick Huard

J

 Claude Jutra

K

 Anthony Kavanagh
 Joey Klein

L

 Florence LaBadie
 Marc Labrèche
 Andrée Lachapelle
 Micheline Lanctôt
 Alexandre Landry
 Bruno Landry
 Jean Lapointe
 Stéphanie Lapointe
 Carole Laure
 Lucie Laurier
 Daniel Lavoie
 Ron Lea
 Pierre Lebeau
 Laurence Leboeuf
 Julie Le Breton
 Jean LeClerc
 Véronique Le Flaguais
 Rachelle Lefevre
 Claude Legault
 Guillaume Lemay-Thivierge
 Guy A. Lepage
 Robert Lepage
 Pauline Little

M

 Fanny Mallette
 Sylvain Marcel
 Alexis Martin
 Patricia McKenzie
 Luck Mervil
 Marc Messier
 Dominique Michel
 Albert Millaire
 Sylvie Moreau
 Wajdi Mouawad

N

Sophie Nélisse

P

 Mahée Paiement
 François Papineau
 Jessica Paré
 Théodore Pellerin
 Yves P. Pelletier
 Missy Peregrym
 Luc Picard
 Antoine Olivier Pilon
 Daniel Pilon
 Donald Pilon
 Yvan Ponton
 Julien Poulin
 Brigitte Poupart
 Marie Prevost
 Danielle Proulx
 Émile Proulx-Cloutier
 Guy Provost

R

 Chantal Renaud
 Ginette Reno
 Isabel Richer
 Patrice Robitaille
 Stéphane Rousseau
 Jean-Louis Roux
 Gildor Roy
 Maxim Roy

S

 Gabriel Sabourin
 Marcel Sabourin
 Michael Sarrazin
 Geneviève Schmidt
 Émile Schneider
 William Shatner
 Norma Shearer
 Gilbert Sicotte
 Hugo St-Cyr
 Janine Sutto

T

 Serge Thériault
 Marie-Soleil Tougas
 Fannie Tremblay
 Serge Turgeon

V

 Karine Vanasse
 Marianne Verville

W

 Max Walker
 Amanda Walsh
 Joseph Wiseman

See also
 Jutra Award
 List of Quebecers
 List of Quebec comedians
 Cinema of Quebec
 Culture of Quebec

Actors
Quebec